The 2005 Campeonato Mineiro de Futebol do Módulo I was the 91st season of Minas Gerais's top-flight professional football league. The season began on January 23 and ended on April 17. Ipatinga won the title for the 1st time.

Participating teams

League table

Final Tournament

Finals

First leg

Second leg

References 

Campeonato Mineiro seasons
Mineiro